Afkari is a Persian-language surname. Notable people with the surname include:

 Habib Afkari (born 1991), Iranian political dissident
 Navid Afkari (1993–2020), Iranian wrestler 

Persian-language surnames